Melaleuca glaberrima is a plant in the myrtle family, Myrtaceae and is endemic to the south-west of Western Australia. It is a dense, spreading shrub with needle shaped, but not sharp leaves and profuse pink or mauve flowers.

Description

The heads appear on old wood and contain 10 to 40 pinky-mauve flowers which fade to white. The stamens are arranged in five bundles around the flower, each bundle containing 8 to 20 stamens.

Taxonomy and naming
Melaleuca glaberrima was first formally described in 1862 by Ferdinand von Mueller in Fragmenta Phytographiae Australiae from a specimen found on "Middle Mount Barren" by George Maxwell. The specific epithet (glaberrima) is from the Latin glaber meaning glabrous, possibly a reference to the material studied by Mueller.

Distribution and habitat
Melaleuca glaberrima occurs between the Stirling Range, Cape Arid and Coolgardie districts in the Coolgardie, Esperance Plains and Mallee biogeographic regions. It grows in a range of soils in heath and woodland.

Conservation status
Melaleuca glaberrima is listed as "not threatened" by the Government of Western Australia Department of Parks and Wildlife.

References

glaberrima
Myrtales of Australia
Plants described in 1862
Endemic flora of Western Australia
Taxa named by Ferdinand von Mueller